Ryerson is an unincorporated area within the Rural Municipality of Maryfield No. 91, in the province of Saskatchewan, Canada.

Footnotes

Maryfield No. 91, Saskatchewan
Unincorporated communities in Saskatchewan
Division No. 1, Saskatchewan